Telavåg or Tælavåg is a village in Øygarden municipality in Vestland county, Norway.

History

Telavåg tragedy
During the occupation of Norway by Nazi Germany, Telavåg played an important role in the secret North Sea boat traffic between Norway and Great Britain. The village was the scene of the Telavåg Tragedy in the spring of 1942, during World War II.
 
On 26 April 1942, after having discovered that some of the inhabitants of Telavåg were hiding two men from the Linge company, Arne Meldal Værum and Emil Gustav Hvaal, the Gestapo arrived to arrest the Norwegian officers. Shots were exchanged, and two prominent German Gestapo officers (Kriminalrat Gerhard Berns and Kriminalsekretär Henry Bertram) were shot dead.  Arne Værum was also killed in the incident.  Emil Hvaal and his son were executed a few months later.

Reichskommissar Josef Terboven personally oversaw the Nazi reprisal, which was quick and brutal. On 30 April, as the villagers were watching, all buildings were destroyed, all boats were sunk or confiscated, and all livestock taken away. All men in the village were either executed or sent to the Nazi concentration camp at Sachsenhausen.  Of the 72 who were deported from Telavåg, 31 were murdered in captivity.  Women and children were imprisoned for two years. 18 Norwegian prisoners (unrelated to Telavåg) held at the Trandum internment camp were also executed as a reprisal. Though smaller in scale, this atrocity is often compared to similar events at Lidice in the Czech Republic and Oradour-sur-Glane in France.

Attractions

North Sea Maritime Museum
The North Sea Maritime Museum in Telavåg (Nordsjøfartmuseet i Televåg) was opened on 26 April 1998. It is a modern building with a  cinema theater seating 100 people and a conference room. The permanent exhibition of The North Sea Traffic Museum deals with the Telavåg tragedy. The museum also exhibits The North Sea Traffic and features Leif Larsen, who as a central person in this traffic became known as "Shetland-Larsen". The Telavåg Tragedy exhibition shows how and why the local community Telavåg has a unique standing in the history of the occupation of Norway.

See also
Shetland bus
List of wars and disasters by death toll

References

External links
Nordsjøfartmuseet website 
Telavåg Online

Øygarden
Villages in Vestland